The Soviet Athletics Championships was an annual outdoor track and field competition organised by the Soviet Athletics Federation, which served as the Soviet national championship for the sport. The competition lasted from 1920 to 1991, being replaced by various national competitions in the post-Soviet states thereafter. It was part of the quadrennial athletics at the Spartakiad of the Peoples of the USSR from 1963 to 1991, though discrete Spartakiad and Soviet Championships were held in 1986. The winners of the event were almost exclusively Soviet nationals, though a limited number of foreign athletes did win the event following an open invitation at the 1979 and 1983 Spartakiads.

Men

100 metres

200 metres

400 metres

800 metres

1500 metres

5000 metres

10,000 metres

Marathon

3000 metres steeplechase

110 metres hurdles

200 metres hurdles

400 metres hurdles

High jump

Pole vault

Long jump

Triple jump

Shot put

Discus throw

Hammer throw

Javelin throw

Decathlon

20 kilometres walk

50 kilometres walk
The 1980 edition of the men's 50 kilometres walk was held over a short course. Times were invalid for the distance, but the winner still stands.

Women

100 metres

200 metres

400 metres

800 metres

1500 metres

3000 metres

5000 metres

10,000 metres

Marathon

2000 metres steeplechase

80 metres hurdles

100 metres hurdles

200 metres hurdles

400 metres hurdles

High jump

Long jump

Triple jump

Shot put

Discus throw

Hammer throw

Javelin throw

Pentathlon

Heptathlon

5000 metres walk

10 kilometres walk

References

Champions 1960–2006
Soviet Championships. GBR Athletics. Retrieved 2021-01-11.

Winners
 List
Soviet Championships
Athletics